The 2016 World Outdoor Bowls Championship women's pairs  was held at the Burnside Bowling Club in Avonhead, Christchurch, New Zealand, from 6 to 11 December 2016.

The women's pairs gold medal was won by Laura Daniels and Jess Sims of Wales.

Section tables

Section 1

Section 2

Finals

Results

References

Bow
Wom
Wor